Urban Gothic is a subgenre of Gothic fiction, film horror and television dealing with industrial and post-industrial urban society. It was pioneered in the mid-19th century in Britain, Ireland and the United States and developed in British novels such as Robert Louis Stevenson's Strange Case of Dr Jekyll and Mr Hyde (1886), and Irish novels such as Oscar Wilde's The Picture of Dorian Gray (1890), and Bram Stoker's Dracula (1897). In the twentieth century, urban Gothic influenced the creation of the subgenres of Southern Gothic and suburban Gothic. From the 1980s, interest in the urban Gothic revived with books like Anne Rice's Vampire Chronicles and a number of graphic novels that drew on dark city landscapes, leading to adaptations in film including Batman (1989), The Crow (1994) and From Hell (2001), as well as influencing films like Seven (1995).

History

Development

In English literature, the architectural Gothic revival and classical Romanticism gave rise to the Gothic novel in the second half of the eighteenth century, often dealing with dark themes in human nature against medieval backdrops and with elements of the supernatural. Beginning with The Castle of Otranto (1764) by Horace Walpole, 4th Earl of Orford, it was perfected as a literary form by Ann Radcliffe in novels such as The Castles of Athlin and Dunbayne (1789), A Sicilian Romance (1790) and The Mysteries of Udolpho (1794). It also included Mary Shelley's Frankenstein (1818) and John Polidori's The Vampyre (1819), which helped found the modern horror genre. This helped create the dark romanticism or American Gothic Fiction of authors like Edgar Allan Poe in works including "The Fall of the House of Usher" (1839) and "The Pit and the Pendulum" (1842) and Nathaniel Hawthorne in "The Minister's Black Veil" (1836) and "The Birth-Mark" (1843). This in turn influenced American novelists like Herman Melville in works such as Moby-Dick (1851). Early Victorian Gothic novels that employed contemporary rural settings included Emily Brontë's Wuthering Heights (1847) and Charlotte Brontë's Jane Eyre (1847).

Whereas these early Gothic novels had tended to use the city as a starting point and then moved to rural locations, abandoning the settings and securities of urban civilisation for wild and dangerous rural regions, the Gothic novels of the mid-nineteenth century began to reverse this process, or were conducted entirely in the modern industrial city, which itself became a zone of liminality, danger and adventure, and from the late twentieth century have been referred to as urban Gothic. Robert Mighall sees the urban Gothic as a genre arising in London in the mid-nineteenth century out of the critique of the impact of industrialisation that led to the discourse on urban reform that can be seen in City Mystery genre, including The Mysteries of Paris (1842–43) and the works of authors like G. W. M. Reynolds' Mysteries of London (1844–8) as well as the stories of Charles Dickens', Oliver Twist (1837–8) and Bleak House (1854). These pointed to the juxtaposition of wealthy, ordered and affluent civilisation next to the disorder and barbarity of the poor within the same metropolis. Bleak House in particular is credited with seeing the introduction of urban fog to the novel, which would become a frequent characteristic of urban Gothic literature and film.

The urban Gothic genre that developed in the Victorian Fin de siècle, beginning with Robert Louis Stevenson's Strange Case of Dr Jekyll and Mr Hyde (1886), was influenced by these views of a hidden city, the Whitechapel murders, by Charles Darwin's ideas on natural selection, and later by Freud's ideas about the human mind. They often incorporated ideas about the influence of modern science on life and the mixture of science and the supernatural in urban Gothic novels has led Katherine Spencer to describe them as "a mediating form between science fiction and fantasy." Dr Jekyll and Mr Hyde restated traditional debates about the nature of good and evil, using motifs from folklore, but with a modern and scientific explanation. Oscar Wilde's The Picture of Dorian Gray (1890), similarly revisited the concept of a Faustian Pact, but in a modern social context. Bram Stoker's Dracula (1897) utilised the eastern fringes of Europe in Transylvania as a point of origin for the arrival in modern provincial and then metropolitan London society of a creature from folklore. In the early twentieth century, the urban Gothic was extended to other cities, like Paris, utilised in Gaston Leroux's The Phantom of the Opera (1909–10).

Modern interpretations

From the twentieth century urban Gothic helped to spawn other subgenres, including Southern Gothic, using the Southern United States as a location, and later Suburban Gothic, which shifted the focus from the urban centre to the residential periphery of modern society. Since the 1980s Gothic horror fiction and urban Gothic in particular has revived as a genre, with series of novels like Anne Rice's Vampire Chronicles and Poppy Z. Brite's Lost Souls, both making New Orleans a key centre of Gothic fantasy. Urban Gothic themes and images were also used in comics and graphic novels, including Frank Miller's Daredevil (from 1979), Batman (from 1986) and Sin City series (from 1991), James O'Barr's The Crow, beside Alan Moore's From Hell (from 1991) and The League of Extraordinary Gentlemen (1999).

Film

Urban Gothic novels were among the earliest and most influential works adapted for the cinema, helping to form the genre of horror film. These included Nosferatu (1922), The Phantom of the Opera (1925), Dracula (1931) and Dr. Jekyll and Mr. Hyde (1941). After World War II, emphasis shifted to films that more often drew inspiration from the insecurities of life, utilizing new technology and dividing into the three subgenres of horror-of-personality, the horror-of-Armageddon and the horror-of-the-demonic. However, during the late 1950s and early 1960s, the British company Hammer Film Productions enjoyed huge international success from Technicolor films involving classic Gothic horror characters, often starring Peter Cushing and Christopher Lee, particularly Dracula (1958), which resulted in many sequels into the 1970s. The 1983 vampire film The Hunger provided a highly influential modernised and urbanised version of Gothic culture. The same themes have been revisited periodically in films like Bram Stoker's Dracula (1992). From the late 1980s urban Gothic-influenced comics were the basis for a number of films that drew on dark city landscapes, including: Batman (1989), Batman Returns (1992), The Crow (1994), Vampire in Brooklyn (1995), Blade (1998), From Hell (2001), The League of Extraordinary Gentlemen (2003), Sin City (2005) and Watchmen (2009). Other films dealing with similar dark themes and urban landscapes include: Seven (1995), Dark City (1998), Fight Club, Hamlet (2000), American Psycho (2000), Underworld (2003), The Machinist (2004), Darling (2015) and The Batman (2022).

Notes

Horror genres
Urban society
Gothic fiction